Mangifera austro-indica is a species of plant in the family Anacardiaceae. It is native to Karnataka and Tamil Nadu in India.

References

austro-indica
Flora of Karnataka
Flora of Tamil Nadu
Vulnerable plants
Taxonomy articles created by Polbot
Taxa named by André Joseph Guillaume Henri Kostermans